Sonia is a feminine given name in many areas of the world including the West, Russia, Iran, and South Asia. Sonia and its variant spellings Sonja and Sonya are derived from the Russian hypocoristic Sonya, an abbreviation of Sofiya (Greek Sophia "Wisdom").

The name was popularised in the English-speaking world by  characters in the novels  Crime and Punishment by Fyodor Dostoyevsky (1866, English translation 1885) and War and Peace by Leo Tolstoy (1869, English translation 1886),  and later by a 1917 bestselling novel, Sonia: Between Two Worlds, by Stephen McKenna. 

Scandinavian countries spell the name with the letter j: Sonja, while many English speaking countries spell it with i or y: Sonia or Sonya.
Many other variant spellings exist.

Notable people

Queen Sonja of Norway (born 1937)
 Sonia, alias of Omaira Rojas Cabrera (born 1967), FARC-EP guerrilla member
 Sonya, cover name of the Soviet spy Ursula Kuczynski (1907-2000)
Sonia Balassanian (born 1942), Iranian-born Armenian painter, sculptor, and curator
Sonja Bakić (born 1984), Serbian pop/rock singer
Sonja Barjaktarović (born 1986), Montenegrin handball goalkeeper
Sonia Ben Ammar (born 1999), French-Tunisian model
Sonja Berndt, American pharmacologist and cancer epidemiologist 
Sônia Braga (born 1950), Brazilian actress
Sonia Cheng, Hong Kong business executive
Sonja Christopher, American Survivor contestant
Sonia Couling (born 1974), Thai model, actress and TV personality
Sonia Darrin (1924–2020), American film actress
Sonia Disa (born 1944), Sri Lankan Sinhala cinema actress
Sonya Eddy (1958-2022), American actress
Sonia Evans (born 1971), English pop singer
Sonia Fergina Citra (born 1993), Indonesian beauty pageant titleholder who won Puteri Indonesia 2018
Sonja Fransson (born 1949), Swedish politician
Sonia Gandhi (born 1946), former President of the Indian National Congress
Sonya Haddad (1936–2004), American translator and surtitler
Sonya Hartnett (born 1968), Australian writer
Sonja Henie (1912–1969), Norwegian figure skater and actress
Sonia Holleyman, British creator, author and illustrator of Mona the Vampire
Sonia E. Howe (born 1871), Russian essayist
Sonia de Ignacio (born 1971), Spanish field hockey player
Sonya Isaacs (born 1974), American Country/Christian singer-songwriter
Sonya Jeyaseelan, Canadian tennis player 
Sonia Kacem (born 1985), Swiss visual artist 
Sonya Koshkina (born 1985), Ukrainian journalist, editor-in-chief 
Sonja Kovač (born 1984), Croatian actress and model
Sonja Kristina (born Sonia Christina Shaw), English singer, notable for being the vocalist for Curved Air
Sonija Kwok (born 1974), Hong Kong actress
Sonja Lang, Canadian linguist who constructed the language Toki Pona
Sonia Lo (born 1992), Hong Kong windsurfer
Sonia Manzano, American actress
Sonja McCullen, American judge
Sonja Morgan, Reality TV actress, The Real Housewives of New York City
Sonia McMahon (1932–2010), Australian socialite, widow of William McMahon
 Sonia Singh (born 1964), Indian television actress 
Sonia O'Sullivan (born 1969), Irish athlete
Sonia Opoku, Ghanaian footballer
 Sonia Peres (1923–2011), wife of Israel's Prime Minister and President Shimon Peres
Sonia Purnell, British writer and journalist
Sonia Rutstein, American musician of the band Disappear Fear
Sonia Rykiel (1930–2016), French designer
Sonja Savić (1961–2008), Serbian actress
Sonya Scarlet (born 1980), singer of Italian band Theatres des Vampires
Sonja Smets, Belgian and Dutch logician
Sonia Sotomayor (born 1954), Associate Justice of the Supreme Court of the United States
Sonya Tayeh, American dancer and choreographer
Sonia Theodoridou (born 1958), Greek soprano singer
Sonja Vasić (née Petrović; born 1989), Serbian basketball player
Sonja Vectomov (born 1979), Czech/Finnish composer/musician
Sonja Vectomov (sculptor), Czech/Finnish sculptor
Sonya Walger (born 1974), English actress best known as Losts Penny Widmore
Sonia Zoberblatt (Sandra Zober, 1927–2011), American actress, first wife of Leonard Nimoy

Fictional characters
 Red Sonja, archetypal fierce and beautiful barbarian
  in the Baby, Please Kill Me! Japanese four-panel manga
Sonya in the Heroes of the Storm, a video game by Blizzard Entertainment
 Sonja in the Underworld series of vampire films
 Sonya Belikova in Vampire Academy novels
 Sonia Belmont in Castlevania Legends, from the Castlevania series
 Sonya Blade in the Mortal Kombat series of video games
 Sonia Cruz, a character in the Netflix series  Grand Army
 Sonia Fowler in British soap opera EastEnders
 Sonia Ganguli in The Namesake by Jhumpa Lahiri
 Sonya Herfmann, also known as Chanel #2, in the television series Scream Queens
 Sonya Marmeladova in Crime and Punishment by Fyodor Dostoevsky
 Sonia Nevermind in Danganronpa 2: Goodbye Despair
 Sonia Rey in Argentine telenovela Rebelde Way by Cris Morena
 Sonya Rostova, character in War and Peace by Leo Tolstoy and the musical based on it, Natasha, Pierre & The Great Comet of 1812
 Sonya Ross in The Maze Runner novel series
 Sonia Solandres in The Pink Panther 2
 Sonya Serebryakova in Uncle Vanya by Anton Chekhov
 Sonia Strumm, rock star in the Mega Man Star Force series of video games
 Sonia Virena in television anime Symphogear AXZ
 Sonia, a character from the game Pokémon Sword and Shield
 Sonja, a character from the game Advance Wars
 Sonia, a character from the 1907 English Play The Merry Widow

Pen name
 Sonia, pen name of the Italian journalist Ottavia Vitagliano

See also

Notes

Feminine given names
Russian feminine given names
Romanian feminine given names
Italian feminine given names
Spanish feminine given names
Portuguese feminine given names
Slavic feminine given names
Polish feminine given names